Jones Mills is an unincorporated community in Westmoreland County, Pennsylvania, United States. Jones Mills has a post office with ZIP code 15646, which opened on May 23, 1850.

References

Unincorporated communities in Westmoreland County, Pennsylvania